Robson may refer to:

People

Surname
Robson (surname), a surname and list of people with that name

Given name
Robson Bonnichsen (1940–2004), American anthropologist
Robson Green (born 1964), British actor
Róbson (footballer, born 1970), born José Róbson do Nascimento, Brazilian politician and football forward
Luis Robson (born 1974), birth name Robson Luis Pereira da Silva, Brazilian footballer
Robson de Souza, (born 1984), Brazilian football player, better known as Robinho
Robson Alves da Silva (born 1986), Brazilian football player for Gold Coast United
Robson Severino da Silva (born 1983), Brazilian football player for Waasland-Beveren
Robson Vaz Shimabuku (born 1988), Brazilian football player
S. Robson Walton (born 1944), eldest son of Sam Walton

Places
Robson, British Columbia, a small community
Robson, West Virginia, an unincorporated village in Fayette County, West Virginia, United States
Mount Robson, a mountain in the Canadian Rockies
Robson Square, landmark civic centre and public plaza in Vancouver, British Columbia
Robson Street, Vancouver, British Columbia

See also
Robson Arms, a Canadian television series
Robson flash memory, a technology from Intel to boost computer startup
Prince George-Mount Robson, a provincial electoral district
Robson & Jerome, an English pop duo
Robson Rotation, a method of printing ballots